Carlos Moreno may refer to:

 Carlos J. Moreno, mathematician 
 Carlos R. Moreno (born 1948), U.S. jurist, ambassador to Belize
 Carlos Moreno de Caro (born 1946), Colombian politician, ambassador to South Africa
 Carlos Moreno (footballer, born 1992), Spanish footballer
 Carlos Bernardo Moreno (born 1967), Chilean track and field athlete
 Carlos Moreno (actor) (1938–2014), Argentine actor
 Carlos Moreno (producer), Mexican telenovelas producer
 Carlos Moreno (urbanist) (born 1959),  Franco-Colombian academic, promoter of the 15-minute city
 Carlos Moreno (footballer, born 1998), Mexican footballer

See also
 Carlos Alfaro Moreno (born 1964), Argentine footballer
 Carlos David Moreno (born 1986), Spanish footballer known as Carlos David